Addagatla Chinna Innayya (2 May 1937 – 1 April 2022) was an Indian prelate of the Catholic Church who served as Bishop of Srikakulam, in the state of Andhra Pradesh, India, from 1993 to 2018.

Biography
Innayya was appointed Bishop of Nalgonda on 17 April 1989 and subsequently ordained on 29 June 1989 by the principal consecrator, Bishop Kagithapu Mariadas and co-consecrators, Archbishop Saminini Arulappa and Bishop John Mulagada at the Maria Rani Cathedral in Nalgonda.

In 1993, the Pope John Paul II named him Bishop of the newly erected Diocese of Srikakulam.

On 12 December 2018, Pope Francis accepted his resignation as bishop.

References

1937 births
2022 deaths
Telugu people
20th-century Roman Catholic bishops in India
21st-century Roman Catholic bishops in India
Christian clergy from Andhra Pradesh
People from Srikakulam district